The National Road 6 leads from Milot to Peshkopi.

The SH6 breaks off from National Road 1 at Milot and travels through Burrel and Bulqizë to Peshkopi. 

The first section, between Milot and Klos, follows the Mat river valley, initially in a narrow cutting through the Skanderbeg range, north of Burrell in the hilly terrain in the Matsenke it often travels far from the river. From Klos, the SH6 rises around 550 metres to the  pass at 842 metres above sea level. East of this, it follows the Bulqizë valley to the Drin river, which it crosses at a narrow point. At Maqellarë, there is a junction with the road to Debar in Macedonia. There is a new by-pass at Maqellarë. From here the SH6 travels north to Peshkopi, travelling through hilly terrain far from the river once more. The first few kilometres of this road have been renovated recently.

Arber Highway 
Between Bulqizë and the Drin, the SH6 has been expanded into a broader, two-lane road. West of Bulqizë, construction was still in progress, as of 2011, as part of the national highway construction project. The new road would provide a direct link from Tirana to the Macedonian border, without the detour through Milot and Burrel. As part of this, the Qafa e Buallit pass will be replaced by a short tunnel. For the section travelling through the mountains between Tirana and Klos, many tunnels and complicated bridge systems are required.

See also
Arber Highway

References 

National roads in Albania